Last of the Buccaneers is a 1950 American Technicolor adventure film directed by Lew Landers and starring Paul Henreid as Jean Lafitte.

Plot
Swashbuckler about the adventures of pirate Jean Lafitte after he helped save New Orleans from a British invasion during the War of 1812.

Cast
 Paul Henreid as Jean Lafitte
 Jack Oakie as Sergeant Dominick 
 Karin Booth as Belle Summers 
 Mary Anderson as Swallow 
 Edgar Barrier as George Mareval 
 John Dehner as Sergeant Beluche 
 Harry Cording as Cragg Brown 
 Eugene Borden as Captain Perez

Production
Henreid's career had suffered since the Red Scare of the late 1940s, which saw him unofficially blacklisted from the major Hollywood studios. He had been making films in New York and France when offered the lead role in Last of the Buccaneers by producer Sam Katzman. It was Henreid's first swashbuckler since the highly successful The Spanish Main (1945). Henreid appeared in the film for a relatively low salary plus a percentage of the profits. Henreid says that because of his blacklisting Columbia Pictures would not hire him but the film was made through an independent company, SK Pictures, he could play the role.

Filming started 14 March 1950. The film's sets were designed by the art director Paul Palmentola.

Hedda Hopper reported that Errol Flynn had written a script called The Last of the Buccaneers in the late 1940s for Flynn to star in but it appears to have no other connection to this film.

Reception
According to Henreid, the film was "a huge success and my percentage brought in an enormous amount of money." He went on to make a number of other swashbucklers for Katzman.

References

External links
Last of the Buccaneers at TCMDB

1950 films
1950s historical adventure films
American historical adventure films
American swashbuckler films
Pirate films
Columbia Pictures films
War of 1812 films
Cultural depictions of Jean Lafitte
1950s English-language films
Films directed by Lew Landers
1950s American films